Planar transformers are devices used to exact standards with precise electrical characteristics such as capacitance, output, and aspect ratio. They are used in military and aerospace projects.

Planar transformers are high frequency transformers used in isolated switchmode power supplies operating at high frequency. As opposed to conventional "wire-wound-on-a-bobbin" transformers, planar transformers usually contain winding turns made of thin copper sheets riveted together at the ends of turns in the case of high current windings, or windings etched on a PCB in a spiral form. As the current conductors are thin sheets of copper, the operating frequency is not limited by skin effect. As such, high power converters built with planar transformers can be designed to operate at relatively high switching frequencies, often 100 kHz or above. This reduces the size of required magnetic components and capacitors, thereby increasing power density.

Advantages over conventional counterparts
 High power density
 Significantly reduced height (low profile)  
 Greater surface area, resulting in improved heat dissipation capability
 Greater magnetic cross-section area, enabling fewer turns  
 Smaller winding area  
 Winding structure facilitates interleaving  
 Lower leakage inductance resulting from fewer turns and interleaved windings  
 Less AC winding resistance  
 Excellent reproducibility, enabled by winding structure

References

Electric transformers